Agra solanoi is a species of carabid beetle. The holotype was collected in Costa Rica and first described to science in 2002.

References

Lebiinae
Beetles described in 2002